Christopher Carter may refer to:

 Christopher Carter (cricketer) (born 1997), Hong Kong cricketer
 Christopher Benfield Carter (1844–1906), Canadian politician

See also 
 Chris Carter (disambiguation)